The International Sleep Products Association (ISPA) is a trade association based in Alexandria, Virginia, United States. Its members are mattress manufacturers and mattress industry components suppliers.

History 
Founded as the National Association of Mattress Manufacturers in 1915, the organization renamed itself two years later as the National Association of Bedding Manufacturers. Its goal was to create state tagging laws (see law label) and address the health sanitation issues affecting consumers. The association's name was changed to the International Sleep Products Association (ISPA) in 1987 to reflect acceptance of international members.

ISPA's stated mission has been to lead and advance the interests of the sleep products industry. It works on behalf of the bedding industry on a range of commercial, health, safety and environmental issues, including legislative lobbying at the state and federal level. It also seeks to present a positive  image of the sleep products industry to the general public.

ISPA today 
ISPA currently represents the sleep products industry and service suppliers around the world. ISPA members range from multinational mattress and sleep products manufacturing companies to small, family-owned operations.

The association provides a range of legislative, informational, and educational services to the mattress industry. Many services are exclusive to ISPA members, others benefit the industry in general as well as the public.

Member support and services 
The association's products and services to members and non-members include:
Services and information designed to assist industry members in reducing bottom-line expenses
Industry news publications
Mattress industry statistical information and market intelligence
Mattress industry advocacy
Industry education and events
Networking opportunities
Consumer outreach and research via the Better Sleep Council
Other tools and publications for members
An online ISPA Job Board, which assists member companies in filling job openings

ISPA provides regular and member communications through its website, through its publications BedTimes and Sleep Savvy and their websites, and through a range of social media including Facebook, LinkedIn, Twitter and its Blog - Bedpost.

 magazine, published monthly, covers mattress industry news for manufacturers and components suppliers. In August 2017, BedTimes marked 100 years of continuous publication with a celebratory feature chock full of industry history and interesting anecdotes.

The BedTimes Supplies Guide is a listing of products and services used in mattress and other sleep products manufacturing.

Sleep Savvy magazine is targeted to mattress retailers. Editorial content centers on tools and information to assist in boosting mattress sales.

ISPA Insider, a weekly industry e-newsletter for members, covers association news, legislative and regulatory issues, meetings and trade show information, and breaking news impacting the mattress industry.

Better Sleep Council (BSC)
Founded by ISPA in 1979, the BSC's stated goal has been to increase mattress sales and shorten the mattress replacement cycle by educating consumers about the importance of sleep to health and quality of life, and that the sleep surface and sleep environment are important contributors to quality of sleep.

The BSC funds regular research studies of consumers to explore attitudes toward mattresses and the shopping experience. Findings assist the BSC in developing its messaging. ISPA membership dues support BSC research and other programs. BSC public relations campaigns aim to keep mattresses top of mind as consumers decide how to spend disposable income. The campaigns target a broad segment of U.S. consumers via print, broadcast and online media.

The BSC's latest example of this is the "Stop Sleeping Around" campaign. Through short videos and other visuals that show consumers sleeping everywhere but their own bed, the campaign reinforces the message that they may need to replace their mattress if they are nodding off during the day because they are not getting 7–8 hours of quality rest on a comfortable, supportive mattress. The campaign advances the BSC’s mission by making the importance of sleep and mattress replacement top of mind in a fun, edgy way.

The annual focal point of the association's public relations campaign is Better Sleep Month (BSM) each May. Media hits for the campaign reach into the millions each year.  During BSM, the BSC has used a national spokesperson for a satellite and radio media tour, as well as 30: and 60: “In the Know” news vignettes, which are put on the BSC website.

The BSC has conducted several studies on consumer shopping behavior and the typical mattress replacement cycle. The council takes credit for helping reduce the average mattress replacement cycle from 13-plus years to about 10 years. The BSC sponsored a groundbreaking study conducted by the Oklahoma State University to scientifically evaluate whether a new mattress improves sleep quality and efficiency, while reducing back, spine, shoulder and neck stiffness, thus leading to a more restful night’s sleep. The results were positive. This study is a resource for the BSC’s consumer messaging.

References

External links
 ISPA Website
 BedTimes Magazine
 Sleep Savvy Magazine
 BedTimes Supplies Guide
 Better Sleep Council Website
 Sleep Products To Help Sleep
 Sleep Products Safety Council

International trade associations
Organizations established in 1915